The Sclerotiniaceae are a family of fungi in the order Helotiales. Many species in this family are plant pathogens.

Genera 
 Asterocalyx
 Botryotinia
 Botrytis
 Ciboria
 Ciborinia
 Coprotinia
 Cudoniopsis
 Dicephalospora
 Dumontinia
 Elliottinia
 Encoelia
 Grovesinia
 Kohninia
 Lambertellina
 Martininia
 Mitrula
 Mitrulinia
 Monilinia
 Moserella (placement uncertain)
 Myriosclerotinia
 Ovulinia
 Phaeosclerotinia
 Poculina
 Pseudociboria
 Pycnopeziza
 Redheadia
 Sclerocrana
 Sclerotinia
 Seaverinia
 Septotinia
 Streptotinia
 Stromatinia
 Torrendiella
 Valdensinia
 Zoellneria

References 

 
Helotiales
Ascomycota families